The Waimeamea River is a river in the Southland Region of New Zealand. It rises in the Longwood Range and flows south-eastward into Te Waewae Bay north of Orepuki.

See also
List of rivers of New Zealand

References

Rivers of Southland, New Zealand
Foveaux Strait
Rivers of New Zealand